
Nymphea was built in 1921 to carry cargo along the canals of Europe and is a classic Dutch design with shallow draught. She presently serves as a hotel barge.

History
Nymphea originally carried barley and hops to a brewery in the north of the Netherlands from Rotterdam and returned with bottles and barrels of beer, on one round trip per week. The owner had seven children and lived in the bow cabin with his wife, and at maximum, five of them at a time. She was first converted in 1978 to carry 20 scouts in hammocks. She was converted to a hotel barge in 1985. The barge has traveled from the Netherlands to Bordeaux on most of the French waterways.  She was the first hotel barge on the southern Canal du Nivernais and the River Seille. She has also been to Barcelona and Monte Carlo by sea. She was moved in 1990 to the isolated River Cher on a trailer. In 2005, part of the Rick Stein's French Odyssey for the BBC was filmed on board.

External links
Nymphea Website

1921 ships
Barges of France
Barges
Hotel barges
Hotels in France